Patrick Lee Williams (born August 26, 2001) is an American professional basketball player for the Chicago Bulls of the National Basketball Association (NBA). He played college basketball for the Florida State Seminoles. He was the fourth pick in the 2020 NBA draft.

Early life and high school career
Williams was born on August 26, 2001, in Charlotte, North Carolina. His parents, Eddie and Janie, played college basketball at Johnson C. Smith University. Williams grew up in Charlotte and attended West Charlotte High School. He was a four-year starter on the Mighty Lions' varsity basketball team. Williams averaged 20.7 points, 7.7 rebounds, 3.7 assists and 2.8 steals in his junior season. Williams was rated a four-star recruit and a consensus top-50 prospect in his class. Williams committed to play college basketball at Florida State over offers from Arizona, Clemson, Louisville, Maryland, NC State, Ohio State, Texas, Virginia Tech and Wake Forest. As a senior, Williams averaged 22.1 points, 9.0 rebounds, 2.8 blocks and 3.1 assists per game and was named the Mecklenburg County Player of the Year by the Charlotte Observer as he led the Lions to the 4A State Championship game. Williams played in the 2019 Jordan Brand Classic. Williams finished his high school career with 1,787 points scored, 749 rebounds and 310 assists over four seasons.

College career
Williams entered his freshman year rated as 21st-best prospect for the 2020 NBA draft according to ESPN. He spent the season as the Seminoles' sixth man. Williams scored 18 points with four rebounds against Western Carolina followed by a 16-point performance against Tennessee-Chattanooga. He scored 14 points and grabbed a career-high nine rebounds in a 65–59 win over North Carolina. The following game, he had 14 points in a 99–81 victory over Miami (Florida). Williams contributed 17 points and seven rebounds in an 80–77 win over Syracuse on February 15. Williams was named to the ACC All-Freshman team and the conference Sixth Man of the Year at the end of the regular season after averaging 9.2 points, 4.0 rebounds and one block per game. After the season, Williams declared for the 2020 NBA draft alongside teammate Devin Vassell.

Professional career

Chicago Bulls (2020–present)
Williams was selected by the Chicago Bulls with the fourth overall pick in the 2020 NBA draft. On November 22, 2020, he signed his rookie scale contract with the Bulls. On December 23, 2020, Williams made his NBA debut, starting and putting up 16 points, four rebounds, one assist, one steal, and one block in a 104–124 loss against the Atlanta Hawks. On May 15, 2021, he scored a season-high 24 points, alongside five rebounds and two steals, in a 91–105 loss to the Brooklyn Nets.

On October 28, 2021, during the Bulls' 103–104 loss to the New York Knicks, Williams suffered a dislocated wrist. The following day, it was announced that he would need surgery, ruling him out for 4-to-6 months. Williams returned to the court on March 21, 2022, recording seven points and two rebounds in a 113–99 win over the Toronto Raptors. On April 10, he scored a career-high 35 points, alongside four rebounds and four assists, in a 124–120 win over the Minnesota Timberwolves. The Bulls qualified for the postseason for the first time since 2017 and faced the Milwaukee Bucks, the reigning champions, during their first-round series. Williams made his playoff debut on April 17, recording five points, three rebounds and two steals in a 86–93 Game 1 loss. The Bulls ended up losing the series in five games.

Career statistics

NBA

Regular season

|-
| style="text-align:left;"|2020–21
| style="text-align:left;"|Chicago
| 71 || 71 || 27.9 || .483 || .391 || .728 || 4.6 || 1.4 || .9 || .6 || 9.2
|-
| style="text-align:left;"|2021–22
| style="text-align:left;"|Chicago
| 17 || 9 || 24.8 || .529 || .517 || .732 || 4.1 || .9 || .5 || .5 || 9.0
|- class="sortbottom"
| style="text-align:center;" colspan="2"| Career
| 88 || 80 || 27.3 || .490 || .413 || .729 || 4.5 || 1.3 || .8 || .6 || 9.2

Playoffs

|-
| style="text-align:left;"|2022
| style="text-align:left;"|Chicago
| 5 || 5 || 30.6 || .468 || .333 || .727 || 5.4 || .8 || 1.0 || .6 || 11.8
|- class="sortbottom"
| style="text-align:center;" colspan="2"|Career
| 5 || 5 || 30.6 || .468 || .333 || .727 || 5.4 || .8 || 1.0 || .6 || 11.8

College

|-
| style="text-align:left;"|2019–20
| style="text-align:left;"|Florida State
| 29 || 0 || 22.5 || .459 || .320 || .838 || 4.0 || 1.0 || 1.0 || 1.0 || 9.2

References

External links

 Florida State Seminoles bio

2001 births
Living people
African-American basketball players
American men's basketball players
Basketball players from Charlotte, North Carolina
Chicago Bulls draft picks
Chicago Bulls players
Florida State Seminoles men's basketball players
Small forwards
21st-century African-American sportspeople